The city of Ottawa, Canada held municipal elections on December 1, 1930.

Mayor of Ottawa
Controller John J. Allen was elected as mayor without opposition, after mayor Frank H. Plant decided to retire after running as a Conservative in the 1930 Canadian federal election.

Ottawa Board of Control
All three incumbent controllers were defeated as voters opted to elect a new slate of controllers. Notably, no French Canadians were elected to the Board of Control, and it was thought that this was the first election to have all four elected controllers be Protestants.

(4 elected)

Ottawa City Council
While voters kicked out the incumbent members of the board of control, they opted to maintain their local incumbent alderman. Only one incumbent councillor (Nelson J. Lacasse) went down in defeat.

(2 elected from each ward)

References
Ottawa Citizen, December 2, 1930; pgs 1, 18-19

Municipal elections in Ottawa
1930 elections in Canada
1930s in Ottawa
1930 Ontario municipal elections
December 1930 events